Namgyal Bhutia (born 11 August 1999) is an Indian professional footballer who plays as a central midfielder or a defender for Indian Super League club Bengaluru.

Career

Indian Arrows
Bhutia started his professional career with developmental side Indian Arrows.

Bengaluru FC
Bhutia was signed by Indian Super League side Bengaluru FC. He represented Bengaluru FC 'B' in I-League 2nd Division. In January 2020, he was selected as a part of the squad in 2020 AFC Cup. In April 2020, Bhutia extended his contract with Bengaluru FC till 2023. Later, he represented his club in both RF Development league and Next Gen cup in 2022 as captain.

Career statistics

Club

Honours

Bengaluru
 Durand Cup: 2022
 Reliance Foundation Development League: 2021–22

References

External links
Namgyal Bhutia profile at indiansuperleague.com

1999 births
Living people
People from Gyalshing district
Indian footballers
Footballers from Sikkim
Bengaluru FC players
Association football midfielders
Indian Arrows players
I-League players
Indian Super League players